Abdallah Alruwaished (born July 18, 1961) is an Arab singer and actor from Kuwait. He has released over thirty albums.

Biography 

Alruwaished began his solo career in the early 1980s with the release of his first album with AlNazaer Music Production Company. Alruwaished released albums throughout the 1980s. During the early 1990s, Alruwaishid relocated temporarily to Egypt as Kuwait was invaded by Iraq. From there he continued his music career. After the end of the Gulf War, Alruwaished returned to Kuwait and continued with his music career.  

In 2008, he recorded the theme song for the Arab Press Production Center television drama series Oyoun Alya.

Discography 
 Rahalti (1983)
 Ay Ma'aza (1984)
 Eb Ay Haal (1985)
 Astahmelek (1986)
 Mashoor (1987)
 Abdallah Alruwaished 1988 (1988)
 Abdallah Alruwaished 1989 (1989)
 Abdallah Alruwaished 1990 (1990)
 Abdallah Alruwaished 1992 (1992)
 Abdallah Alruwaished (1993)
 Alruwaished 1994 (1994)
 Ramady (1995)
 Lemni Ebshoug (1996)
 Tasawer (1997)
 Wainek (1998)
 Sadigeeni (1999)
 Watan Omri (2000)
 Wein Rayeh (2001)
 Efeeni (2002)
 Ah Ya Zeman (2003)
 El Shoug W El Dama'a (2004)
 Mafee Ahad Mertah (2005)
 Abdallah Alruwaished 2006 (2006)
 Abdallah Alruwaished 2008 (2008)
 Temana (2009)
 Laylat Omer (2010)
 Enty Helm (2011)
 Malik Bel Hob (2015)
 Tesalem Alek (2017)

References

External links 
 Official webpage (arabic)
 Jordan Festival, Biography: Abdallah Alruwaishid

1961 births
Living people
Kuwaiti male singers
Kuwaiti male film actors
Kuwaiti male television actors
Rotana Records artists